Gharde Geldenhuys (born 15 September 1981) is a Namibian female artistic gymnast. She appeared at the 1998 Commonwealth Games, 1997 World Championship finishing 108th in the All Around, and the 1999 World Championships. She competed at the 2000 Summer Olympics representing  Namibia through wild card entry in the artistic gymnastics event.

References

External links

1981 births
Living people
Namibian female artistic gymnasts
Gymnasts at the 2000 Summer Olympics
Sportspeople from Swakopmund
White Namibian people
Olympic gymnasts of Namibia